Kirsten Lindsey O'Brien (born 23 February 1972) is an English television presenter and actress. She is perhaps best known for her work presenting for the BBC, including the popular CBBC art programme SMart from 1999 to 2009, and CBeebies pre-school art spin-off programme SMarteenies in 2002.

Career
O'Brien studied media and communications at the University of Central England in Birmingham, graduating in 1993. She got her first broadcast experience on the university's student radio station which led to her first job in 1995 at Tyne Tees Television where she made her presenting debut on a children's science programme.
In 1996 she joined the team presenting the continuity links during the BBC's children's programming CBBC. She stayed there for three-and-a-half years during which time she became best known for her partnership with puppet Otis the Aardvark. Both O'Brien and Otis also co-presented with other people (and often solo). The 1997 Saturday morning spin-off Saturday Aardvark was entirely built around them. Puppeteer Dave Chapman would often reduce O'Brien to tears of helpless laughter with his ad-libs.

O'Brien left the CBBC on-air presentation team in 1999 but is still a regular on children's TV and radio. She has co-hosted SMart and its spin-offs  SMart on the Road and SMarteenies (for the pre-school CBeebies channel).  On radio she was one of the presenters of BBC 7's Little Toe Radio Show. In 2004 she played Peter Pan in pantomime. The same year O'Brien successfully took part in a lumberjack competition for the BBC series Bring It On. She performed a sketch show during the Edinburgh Fringe in August 2006 entitled Lesley's Lunch Hour - Not During Lunch, And Not Quite An Hour along with double act partner Ruth Bratt. Then in 2007 she took her comedy show Kirsten O'Brien - Confessions of a Children's TV Presenter to Edinburgh.

Between 28 May and 15 June 2007, she co-presented Springwatch Trackers alongside Steve Backshall. Transmitted live on BBC Two from a farm in Devon and repeated later in the day on the CBBC Channel the show featured teams of boys and girls who were set a series of Tracker challenges.

She has been a guest on Stephen Merchant's on BBC Radio 6 Music, Through the Keyhole and several times on Rob Brydon's Annually Retentive.

O'Brien filmed  Kirsten's Topless Ambition, a documentary for BBC3 that aired on 28 April 2009, in which she was "facing a huge decision - whether to do what many other female presenters had done before her and take her clothes off for a lads' mag to try to clinch bigger, better presenting jobs and a more adult audience." Ultimately she only received one offer and opted against doing this and decided to perform more stand-up comedy. She also stated on the show that she had been ready to leave SMart since co-presenter Mark Speight's death and felt it was not right to stay. Kirsten then stayed with CBBC to take over as host of game show Gimme a Break.

From 2009 to 2010, she made appearances on the morning show GMTV presenting on-location. On 19 February 2010 she and George Lamb presented EastEnders: The Aftermath where they interviewed members of the cast about the live 25th anniversary episode. She took part in a celebrity version of TV show Total Wipeout, which aired on 2 January 2010.

In 2010 O'Brien, along with actor and friend Will Mellor, appeared in The World's Toughest Driving Tests, a driving challenge.  They travelled the world mastering the biggest and hardest-to-drive vehicles to find out who is the better driver. In the first episode, which aired in February 2010, O'Brien won when she beat Mellor driving a Romanian TR-85 combat tank. She went on to take wins in the third and sixth episode. Three wins, together with a draw in the fifth episode meant that Kirsten was the overall winner of the series.

On 31 December 2010, she appeared on BBC1's Celebrity Mastermind answering questions on Reeves and Mortimer (scoring 13) & 24 overall with 1 pass, coming third. She donated her fee to Teesside Hospice. On 9 January 2011, she was spotted at the V&A Museum of Childhood during filming of a secret new TV series. On 26 March 2011, she was a compere for one of the Teenage Cancer Trust shows at the Royal Albert Hall at which Editors headlined. On 3 March 2012, she appeared on BBC 1 Let's Dance for Sport Relief. She danced to Van Halen's "Jump". This was followed by an appearance on Big Brother's Bit on the Side in June 2012.

O'Brien was announced on 12 June 2013 as the co-presenter of Heart Wiltshire's Breakfast programme alongside Ben Atkinson, effective 1 July 2013.

In 2019, she became a presenter and newsreader for Andrew Peach's Breakfast show on BBC Radio Berkshire.

Filmography

Television

Theatre

Personal life 
O'Brien plays tennis, and has taken part in swimming, abseiling and netball events for charity. She suffers from asthma and is a keen Middlesbrough F.C. fan; she has been involved in charity work with the club, including the Premier League's Creating Chances programme. She is married to Mark Drake. They became parents on 15 December 2011 when O'Brien gave birth to a baby boy whom they named Fox Michael Drake. In September 2017 O'Brien tweeted that she had given birth to twins.

References

External links 

1972 births
Alumni of Birmingham City University
British children's television presenters
English people of Norwegian descent
English people of Irish descent
English television presenters
Living people
People from Nunthorpe
People from Middlesbrough